El Tambo is a municipality of Cauca Department, Colombia, located about 33 kilometres west of the departmental capital Popayán in the Andes mountain range. Within its territories is located the Munchique National Park. El Tambo is the main producer of peach palm or chontaduro in the region.

References

Municipalities of Cauca Department